Karst usually refers to Karst topography, a landscape shaped by the dissolution of layers of soluble bedrock.

Karst may also refer to the following:
Karst (surname)
Karst Plateau, a limestone plateau region in Italy and Slovenia
22868 Karst, an asteroid
KARST (Kilometer-square Area Radio Synthesis Telescope), Chinese telescope 
Karst, a character in Nintendo's Golden Sun video game series
Karst Trail, a footpath in Germany

See also
Slovak Karst, a mountain range in Slovakia
Kaarst, Germany